Barro is a ghost town and railroad siding in Tooele County, Utah, United States. It is located along the Central Corridor Union Pacific Railroad rail line and the Wendover Cut-off (Old U.S. Route 40) and south of Interstate 80 in the Great Salt Lake Desert.

See also

 List of ghost towns in Utah

References

Ghost towns in Tooele County, Utah
Ghost towns in Utah
Great Salt Lake Desert